Woldu is a surname. Notable people with the surname include:

Birhan Woldu (born 1981), Ethiopian nurse famous as a starving child
Paul Woldu (born 1984), Canadian football player
Sabagadis Woldu (1780–1831), Ethiopian governor
Tekeste Woldu (born 1945), Ethiopian cyclist

See also
Wold (surname)